The Nambunaeryuk Line is a planned high-speed rail line between Gimcheon, North Gyeongsang Province and Geoje, South Gyeongsang Province.

Stations
Only Gimcheon and Geoje stations are confirmed as destinations on the line.

Disputes and controversies
Legislators and other officials from urban areas in the region served are conflicting over station placement. For example, the Goryeong County government has encouraged a station to be built there based on the history of the area.

Originally, the line was planned to terminate at Gimcheon–Gumi station but was later shifted to Gimcheon, which is not currently served by a high-speed line. There are suspicions that National Assembly member Song Eon-seok advocated for the move because his family owns a commercial building across from the station.

References

Korail lines